Resistance paper, also known as conductive paper and by the trade name Teledeltos paper is paper impregnated or coated with a conductive substance such that the paper exhibits a uniform and known surface resistivity.  Resistance paper and conductive ink were commonly used as an analog two-dimensional electromagnetic field solver.  Teledeltos paper is a particular type of resistance paper.

References

Analog computers
Electrical resistance and conductance